NPO Radio 1 is a public-service radio channel in the Netherlands, broadcasting mainly news and sport. It is part of the Netherlands Public Broadcasting system, NPO.

History
The channel originated in 1947 as "Hilversum 2", and transmitted using its original name until 1 December 1985, when the name was changed to "Radio 1", and remained so until becoming "NPO Radio 1" in 2014.

Content contributors
As of 2019, the following broadcasting organizations participate in the production of NPO Radio 1's programming:
AVROTROS
BNNVARA
EO
Human
KRO-NCRV
MAX
NOS
NTR
PowNed
VPRO
WNL

See also
 List of radio stations in the Netherlands

External links
 Official website

Radio stations in the Netherlands
Netherlands Public Broadcasting
Radio stations established in 1947

News and talk radio stations